The NCAA Division II baseball tournament is an annual college baseball tournament held at the culmination of the spring regular season and which determines the NCAA Division II college baseball champion.  The initial rounds of the tournament are held on campus sites, and, since 2009, the NCAA Division II Baseball National Finals have been held at the USA Baseball National Training Complex in Cary, North Carolina with the complex earning the bid to host through at least the 2026 championship. University of Mount Olive and Town of Cary are co-hosts of the National Finals.

Currently, Florida Southern has won the most Division II baseball titles with nine.

Format 
The 56-team tournament consists of a field of eight double-elimination regionals. The eight regions are the Atlantic, Central, East, Midwest, South, Southeast, South Central and West. In most cases, the No. 1 seed hosts a regional.

The eight regional champions advance to the National Finals, which also follows a double-elimination format. Teams are not re-seeded for the National Finals. The tournament field is broken up into two four-team brackets. When four teams remain, the two one-loss teams play the unbeaten team from the opposite bracket. The two remaining teams play each other for the championship. If both finalists are unbeaten, the championship is, in effect, a best two-out-of-three series. If both finalists have one loss, the championship is a single winner-takes-all game. If one finalist is unbeaten and one finalist has a loss, the one-loss team must defeat the unbeaten team twice to win the championship. The unbeaten team needs to beat the one-loss team only once to win the championship.

Results 

 Participation vacated by the NCAA Committee on Infractions

Champions
Teams that no longer compete in Division II are in italics. All such teams now compete in Division I.

 Schools highlighted in pink are closed or no longer sponsor athletics.
 Schools highlighted in yellow have reclassified athletics from NCAA Division II.

See also

 NCAA Division I Baseball Championship
 NCAA Division III Baseball Championship
 NAIA World Series
 National Club Baseball Association
 List of college baseball awards
 U.S. college baseball awards
 Pre-NCAA baseball champion

References

External links
 NCAA Division II baseball